This article lists events that occurred during 2005 in Estonia.

Incumbents
President – Arnold Rüütel
Prime Minister – Juhan Parts (until 12 April); Andrus Ansip (starting 12 April)

Events
Tartu Department Store was built.
10 August – Copterline Flight 103.

Births

Deaths

See also
 2005 in Estonian television

References

 
2000s in Estonia
Estonia
Estonia
Years of the 21st century in Estonia